Birdie is an unincorporated community in Quitman County, Mississippi. Birdie is located on Mississippi Highway 315, northwest of Marks.

References

Unincorporated communities in Quitman County, Mississippi
Unincorporated communities in Mississippi